Cannon and Ball's Casino (also known as Casino) was a short-lived variety programme hosted by the veteran comedy team of Tommy Cannon and Bobby Ball. It was described as part comedy-show, part game-show and aired on Saturday evening at 6.10 pm. The guests were entertainers such as Mike Osman, Gilbert O'Sullivan, Roxette and Big Country.

Episodes
The series ran for 9 episodes. The show ran weekly for 7 episodes and then skipped 6 weeks before resuming its weekly schedule. In addition, there is an unaired pilot.

References

External links

BFI

1990 British television series debuts
1990 British television series endings
1990s British game shows
ITV game shows
Television series by Yorkshire Television
Television series by ITV Studios
English-language television shows